The Swedish women's national ice hockey team or Damkronorna ("the Lady Crowns" in Swedish) represents Sweden at the International Ice Hockey Federation's IIHF World Women's Championships. The women's national team is controlled by Swedish Ice Hockey Association. Sweden has 3,425 female players in 2011.

History
The Swedish team had traditionally been the fourth-best women's team in the world, behind Canada, USA and Finland. During the 1997 World Championship, Sweden qualified for the 1998 Olympic tournament in Nagano, ending up 5th. However, the team has shown steady improvement since 2001, winning bronze medals at the 2002 Winter Olympics, the 2005 Women's World Ice Hockey Championships, and the 2007 Women's World Ice Hockey Championships, and a silver medal at the 2006 Winter Olympics. On 31 August 2011, Canada was bested by Sweden for just the second time in 66 all-time international meetings. Canada suffered from a 4–1 second-period deficit and lost by a 6–4 score.  On 9 April 2019, at the 2019 World Championship in Espoo, Finland, they lost to Japan 3–2. Sweden has relegated to Division I for the first time in Women's Worlds history. The current head coach is Ulf Lundberg, who was hired to replace Ylva Martinsen in 2020.

Records
Sweden is the first country in the history of the sport other than Canada and the United States to compete in the finals of any international women's hockey tournament.
On 7 November 2008, in Lake Placid, Sweden defeated Canada for the first time in women's ice hockey with the 2–1 win in overtime at 4 Nations Cup.

Tournament record

Olympic Games
1998 – Finished in 5th place
2002 – Won bronze medal 
2006 – Won silver medal 
2010 – Finished in 4th place
2014 – Finished in 4th place
2018 – Finished in 7th place
2022 – Finished in 8th place

World Championship
1990 – Finished in 4th place
1992 – Finished in 4th place
1994 – Finished in 5th place
1997 – Finished in 5th place
1999 – Finished in 4th place
2000 – Finished in 4th place
2001 – Finished in 7th place
2004 – Finished in 4th place
2005 – Won bronze medal 
2007 – Won bronze medal 
2008 – Finished in 5th place
2009 – Finished in 4th place
2011 – Finished in 5th place
2012 – Finished in 5th place
2013 – Finished in 7th place
2015 – Finished in 5th place
2016 – Finished in 5th place
2017 – Finished in 6th place
2019 – Finished in 9th place (relegated to Division IA)
2020 – Cancelled due to the COVID-19 pandemic
2021 – Cancelled due to the COVID-19 pandemic
2022 – Finished in 7th place

European Championship
1989 – Won silver medal 
1991 – Won silver medal 
1993 – Won silver medal 
1995 – Won silver medal 
1996 – Won gold medal

3/4 Nations Cup
2000 – Finished in 4th place
2001 – Won bronze medal  (3 Nations Cup)
2002 – Finished in 4th place
2003 – Finished in 4th place
2004 – Won bronze medal 
2005 – Finished in 4th place
2006 – Won bronze medal 
2007 – Finished in 4th place
2008 – Won bronze medal 
2009 – Won bronze medal 
2010 – Finished in 4th place

Team

Current roster
Roster for the 2022 IIHF Women's World Championship.

Head Coach: Ulf Lundberg

2022 Olympic Qualifying Tournament Roster
Roster for the qualifying tournament for the 2022 Winter Olympics.

Head Coach: Ulf Lundberg

Famous players
Gunilla Andersson
Erika Holst
Kim Martin Hasson
Maria Rooth
Pernilla Winberg

Awards and honors
Maria Rooth, 2005 Women's World Ice Hockey Championships All-Star team
Kim Martin and Maria Rooth, 2006 Women's Ice hockey at the Winter Olympics All-Star team

See also
Women's ice hockey in Sweden

References

External links
Official website
IIHF profile

 
Nat
Women's national ice hockey teams in Europe
 
1987 establishments in Sweden